Kerstin Kassner (born 7 January 1958) is a German politician. Born in Radebeul, Saxony, she represents The Left. Kerstin Kassner has served as a member of the Bundestag from the state of Mecklenburg-Vorpommern since 2013.

Life 
Kerstin Kassner grew up on the island of Rügen and learned the profession of a waitress after finishing school. In 1981 she became restaurant manager at the FDGB holiday service in Binz. She completed a distance learning course, which she began at the Leipzig Graduate School of Management during this time, as a graduate economist in the hotel and restaurant industry. Afterwards she continued to work in various positions for the FDGB-Feriendienst and managed a hotel until 1991. After completing her holiday service, she became self-employed and ran her own pension at Putgarten from 1992 to 2018. From 2001 till 2011 she was District Administrator of the Rügen district in the federal state of Mecklenburg-Western Pomerania. She became member of the bundestag after the 2013 German federal election. She is a member of the Committee on Tourism and the Committee on Petitions. In her parliamentary group, Kassner is parliamentary manager. She is spokesperson for tourism policy and local politics.

References

External links 

  
 Bundestag biography 

1958 births
Living people
Members of the Bundestag for Mecklenburg-Western Pomerania
Female members of the Bundestag
21st-century German women politicians
Members of the Bundestag 2017–2021
Members of the Bundestag 2013–2017
Members of the Bundestag for The Left